Gateway Galactic, Inc. was formed in 2014 in Ames, Iowa and is an aerospace company with the goal to reduce the cost of commercial spaceflight, and is currently developing an orbital propellant depot, Antaios.  Gateway Galactic was founded by Justin Myers and Floyd Richardson, who currently operate as the company's key executives.

Antaios
Antaios is a propellant depot currently in development by Gateway Galactic, Inc. The name Antaios is an indirect reference to Anti, the ferryman in ancient Egyptian mythology. Anti's role was to grant Horus passage between the human world and their world. Much like Anti, Antaios will allow passage to far away locations in a more cost effective way.

Gateway Galactic is pioneering the new industry of selling fuel in orbit. An innovative feature of Antaios is its space saving design allowing it to be small enough for a single launch, yet large enough to handle the vast quantities of fuel that will be needed.

Propellant offered 
 Rocket Grade Kerosene - RP1
 Liquid Hydrogen - LH2
 Liquid Methane - LCH4
 Liquid Oxygen - LOX

See also

 List of space stations
 Private spaceflight
 Propellant depot
 Space colonization

External links
 
 Antaios

Companies based in Iowa
Proposed space stations
Private spaceflight companies
Aerospace companies of the United States